Vasil Georgiev Gospodinov (Bulgarian: Васил Георгиев Господинов; born ) is a Bulgarian male weightlifter, most recently competing in the 109 kg division at the 2018 World Weightlifting Championships.

Career
He was the silver medallist at the 2017 European Weightlifting Championships.

Major results

References

Living people
1993 births
Bulgarian male weightlifters
European Weightlifting Championships medalists